The United States Customs House is a custom house at 610 S. Canal Street in the Near West Side neighborhood of Chicago, Illinois. The building opened in 1933 to meet the city's need for a larger custom house, especially with the large Chicago Main Post Office opening nearby. Two architecture firms, the Burnham Brothers and Nimmons, Carr & Wright, designed the Classical Moderne building. The building's design includes vertical columns of windows divided by pilasters, a black granite entrance surround and base, and a parapet with a bas-relief eagle on either side. While the building was originally seven stories tall, an additional four stories and a new penthouse were added in 1940.

The building was added to the National Register of Historic Places on August 4, 2016.

References

Government buildings on the National Register of Historic Places in Chicago
Moderne architecture in Illinois
Government buildings completed in 1933
Custom houses in the United States
Custom houses on the National Register of Historic Places